Park Bae-jong (born 23 October 1989) is a South Korean footballer who plays as goalkeeper for Suwon FC in K League 2.

Career
Park signed with Korea National League side Suwon FC in 2012.

In 2013, he and his team took part in the second division K League Challenge. He made his professional debut in the league match against FC Anyang on 28 April 2013.

References

1989 births
Living people
Association football goalkeepers
South Korean footballers
Suwon FC players
Asan Mugunghwa FC players
Korea National League players
K League 2 players
K League 1 players